David Oswald Nelson (October 24, 1936 – January 11, 2011) was an American actor. He was the older brother of musician Ricky Nelson.

Early life
Nelson was born October 24, 1936 in New York City, the elder son of entertainment couple Harriet Hilliard Nelson and Ozzie Nelson who was of Swedish descent. His younger brother was singer Ricky Nelson. In late 1941, Nelson aged five, moved with his parents from Tenafly, New Jersey to Los Angeles, California.

He attended Hollywood High School, balancing his studies, playing on the football team and his TV work. He later attended the University of Southern California and was a member of Kappa Sigma fraternity.

Career

Along with his brother and their parents, Nelson appeared on the long-running sitcom The Adventures of Ozzie and Harriet in the 1950s and 1960s. Late in the run of the series, David directed several episodes. After the series' end, he continued acting, directing and producing. His most memorable break-out role was in the 1959 thriller The Big Circus, wherein he played a disturbed, apparently homicidal, troubled youth, while his last film appearance was in the lighter 1990 film Cry-Baby. For his contribution to the motion picture industry, David Nelson was honored with a star on the Hollywood Walk of Fame at 1501 Vine Street, on May 9, 1996.

Personal life
Nelson had two sons—Daniel Blair and James Eric from his first marriage with June Blair, which ended in divorce. He later adopted two sons and a daughter—John, Eric, and Teri—during his second marriage to Yvonne Huston.

Death
Nelson died on January 11, 2011, in Century City, California, from complications of colon cancer.

Filmography

Actor
 Here Come the Nelsons (1952)
 The Adventures of Ozzie and Harriet (320 episodes, 1952–1966)
 Peyton Place (1957)
 The Remarkable Mr. Pennypacker (1959)
 The Big Circus (1959)
 Day of the Outlaw (1959)
 -30- (1959)
 The Big Show (1961)
 Hondo (1 episode, 1967)
 Swing Out, Sweet Land (1970)
 The D.A. (1 episode, 1971)
 Smash-Up on Interstate 5 (1976)
 Up in Smoke (1978)
 The Love Boat (1 episode, 1978)
 High School U.S.A. (1983)
 A Family for Joe (1990)
 Cry-Baby (1990)

Director
 The Adventures of Ozzie and Harriet (3 episodes)
 O.K. Crackerby! (Unknown episodes)
 Childish Things (1969)
 Easy to Be Free (1973)
 Ozzie's Girls (1973)
 Death Screams (1982)
 Last Plane Out (1983)
 Goodnight, Beantown (1 episode, 1984)
 A Rare Breed (1984)

Producer
 Ozzie's Girls (1973)
 Easy to Be Free (1973)
 Last Plane Out (1983)

Awards

References

External links

Ozzie and Harriet Nelson Papers (includes papers related to David and Ricky) at the University of Wyoming - American Heritage Center

1936 births
2011 deaths
American male television actors
American male film actors
American male child actors
20th-century American male actors
Male actors from New York (state)
American television directors
Film directors from New Jersey
Film producers from New Jersey
University of Southern California alumni
People from Tenafly, New Jersey
American people of Swedish descent
Deaths from cancer in California
Deaths from colorectal cancer
Burials at Westwood Village Memorial Park Cemetery
Television producers from New Jersey